Carissa macrocarpa is a shrub native to tropical and southern Africa. It is commonly known as the Natal plum and, in South Africa, the large num-num. In Zulu, as well as in the Bantu tribes of Uganda, it is called Amathungulu or umThungulu oBomvu. In Afrikaans the fruit is called noem-noem.

C. macrocarpa deals well with salt-laden winds, making it a good choice for coastal areas.  It is commonly found in the coastal bush of the Eastern Cape and Natal. It produces shiny, deep green leaves and snowy white flowers whose perfumed scent intensifies at night. Like other Carissa species, C. macrocarpa is a spiny, evergreen shrub containing latex. They bloom for months at a time.  The ornamental plump, round, crimson fruit appears in summer and fall (autumn) at the same time as the blooms. In moderate, coastal areas the fruits appear through the year. The fruit can be eaten out of hand or made into pies, jams, jellies, and sauces.  Some claim that other than the fruit, the plant is poisonous. However, this claim is a myth, possibly based on similarities to other plants with milky sap. The College of Agricultural and Environmental Sciences at
University of California, Davis rates the plant as mildly toxic. 
It appears in the South African National tree list as number 640.3.

A traditional food plant in Africa, this little-known fruit has potential to improve nutrition, boost food security, foster rural development and support sustainable landcare.

Taxonomy
Danish naturalist Christian Friedrich Ecklon described the Natal plum.

Distribution 
Carissa macrocarpa grows mainly in coastal areas of South Africa. It can be found on sand dunes and on the edges of coastal forests in the Eastern Cape and northwards to Natal and Mozambique. The species also occurs in Zambia and Zimbabwe and further north in the Democratic Republic of the Congo and Kenya. Today the plant is also growing commonly in southern Florida and is cultivated in southern California and used widely as an ornamental in Central America and the Caribbean.

Horticultural aspects

Propagation 

Carissa macrocarpa is quite easy to grow. Its seeds germinate two to four weeks after sowing. The development of the seedlings is very slow at first. Plants cultivated from seeds are bearing fruits within the first two years. A vegetative propagation is possible and preferred. The most efficient method consists of notching young branchlets by cutting them halfway through. Then they are bent downwards and allowed to hang limply. After the young branchlets have built a callus, in approximately two months, the cutting has to be removed from the parent and planted in sand under moderate shade. Roots form within one month. Carissa macrocarpa will produce fruits within the first two years applying this reproduction method.

Fertilizing 
The maintenance of Carissa macrocarpa is simple. The plant is indigenous to South Africa and does not need fertilizer.

Pollination 

In the homeland of Carissa macrocarpa night-flying insects pollinates the white, bisexual flowers. Out of its origin area unfruitfulness has been attributed to inadequate pollination. However, hand pollination is possible and in future poor pollination could be avoided by cultivation of floral structures that are highly favourable for self-fertilization.

Orchard design 
Narrow hedges are recommended as orchard design for Carissa macrocarpa due to its prickles. Like this the access to the fruits which are growing on the top of the bush is much simpler. Pruning the plant is beneficial because it induces the development of more fruiting tips. Beyond cutting, little pruning work has to be done to restrain the bush from massive growth. This results in an increasing amount of fruits per plant.

Harvesting 

With a minimal yield of 3 tons per hectare under commercial production in South Africa, the productivity is considered as high. The main fruit production is in summer with slightly varying ripening times. So each fruit must be picked when it is ripe. Under good growing conditions the plant also produces many fruits during the off-season. During the harvest attention must be paid to the ripe fruits’ skin as it can be easily bruised and is highly perishable.

Cultivars for crop production 
Horticultural scientists in South Africa and the USA (Florida and California) have selected and named several Carissa types that tend to produce fruits more reliably. The fruits are larger, have a good texture and contain fewer seeds. In California they selected Fancy (many large fruits with few seeds), Torrey Pines (good crop production and abundant pollen), Frank (good pollen supplier but low yield), Chelsey and Serena. In Florida Gifford is one of the best fruit bearers. In Africa C. haematocarpa is defined suitable for drier areas and C. bispinosa for higher altitudes.

Environmental requirements 
Carissa macrocarpa requires warm, moist subtropical climate. It tolerates different exposures as full sun and fairly heavy shade. As a coastal plant it can deal very well with salty ocean spray.

References

External links
Desert-Tropicals.com

 Images on iSpot
 

macrocarpa
Flora of Southern Africa
Flora of South Tropical Africa
Flora of the Democratic Republic of the Congo
Flora of Kenya
Crops originating from South Africa
Fruits originating in Africa
Plants used in bonsai
Garden plants of Southern Africa